Brood of the Witch Queen is a 1918 supernatural novel by Arthur Henry Sarsfield Ward, known better under his pseudonym, Sax Rohmer.

The story deals with Robert Cairn and his suspicions of Antony Ferrara, the adopted son of an old friend and colleague of Robert's father, Dr Bruce Cairn, of infernal magic and supernatural influence.

Plot 

The novel begins with the strange murder of Sir Michael Ferrara. A horrifying series of events follows, leading to a woman being used against her will to prey on her husband and then abducted and killed inside a secret chamber in an old Egyptian pyramid.  Only after a series of adventures and investigation is Antony Ferrara made powerless by Dr Bruce Cairn destroying the source of his control — the famed Book of Thoth — upon which Ferrara is no longer able to control the elemental he has summoned and is found as a burned corpse the day after.

Reception 

H.P. Lovecraft compared the novel to Bram Stoker's Dracula, alongside Richard Marsh's The Beetle or Gerald Biss' The Door of the Unreal in his essay Supernatural Horror in Literature. Les Daniels identified the book as being probably Rohmer's best novel, noting that it lacked the pseudo-scientific explanations usually employed by the author and concluding that "Rohmer's occult lore was never as well employed as in this tale... and he never equalled the claustrophobic chills of the scenes in the bowels of a pyramid".

References
Notes

Sources

External links
 
 
 

1918 British novels
American horror novels
Novels by Sax Rohmer